Debrah is a surname and a feminine given name.

Debrah is a Hebrew name meaning "bee". It is a feminine name that is often associated with the biblical figure Deborah, who was a prophetess and judge in the Old Testament. The name is also associated with the Hebrew word for "bee", which is "deborah".

It may refer to:

 Ameyaw Debrah, Ghanaian blogger and freelance journalist
 Ernest Debrah (1947–2016), Ghanaian politician
 Julius Debrah (born 1966?), Ghanaian politician
 Debrah Farentino (born 1959), American actress, producer and journalist
 Debrah Scarlett, stage name of Norwegian-Swiss singer and songwriter Joanna Deborah Bussinger (born 1993)

See also
 Mercy Yvonne Debrah-Karikari, Ghanaian diplomat
 Debra

References

Feminine given names